The 1994 Hong Kong District Board elections were held on 18 September 1994 for all 18 districts of Hong Kong and 346 members from directly elected constituencies. It was the last district-level elections in the colonial period before the handover of Hong Kong in 1997. It was the first elections to be held after the abolition of the appointed seats as proposed by the new electoral arrangements, as the last step of the democratisation by the then Governor Chris Patten before the handover.

Despite set against the British-Chinese dispute over Hong Kong's political reform, the election was influenced by local issues such as bus fares and garbage collection. The turnout of 33.1 per cent, slightly higher than the 32.5 per cent turnout for the 1991 District Board elections. Almost 700,000 votes cast were 60 per cent more than in the previous election and reflect the broader franchise stemming from Patten's reform package.

Under the Patten reform package, the voting age was lowered to 18 from 21, appointed members were abolished, and District Board members were given responsibility of filling ten of the 60 Legislative Council seats through Election Committee constituency in the 1995 Legislative Council election. The multiple-member single-constituency electoral method was also changed to single-member constituency method.

The pro-democracy alliance, the United Democrats–Meeting Point, which was undergoing the merger plan of creating the Democratic Party, captured the lead with 75 seats (77 seats in some other materials) and teamed up with smaller pro-democracy parties to gain control of five of the 18 District Boards, Central and Western District, Sham Shui Po District and Kwun Tong District in Hong Kong Island and Kowloon, and Tuen Mun District and Kwai Tsing District in the New Territories. The biggest pro-Beijing party, the Democratic Alliance for the Betterment of Hong Kong (DAB) won 37 seats, doing better than expected, while conservative, pro-business candidates of the Liberal Party, the Liberal Democratic Federation of Hong Kong (LDF) and the Hong Kong Progressive Alliance came in below expectations with 30 seats.

After the elections, Beijing appointed 200 District Affairs Advisers as the part of establishing a political structure parallel to that of the British one, as it claimed that Patten's reform violated the constitution and Sino-British agreements. After the handover, the 1994 elected District Boards transformed into 18 Provisional District Boards with the reintroduction of the appointed seats by Chief Executive Tung Chee-hwa. The Provisional District Boards were replaced by the District Councils elected in 1999.

Results

General outcome

|-
! style="background-color:#E9E9E9;text-align:center;" colspan=3 |Political Affiliation
! style="background-color:#E9E9E9;text-align:right;" |Popular vote
! style="background-color:#E9E9E9;text-align:right;" |%
! style="background-color:#E9E9E9;text-align:right;" |Standing
! style="background-color:#E9E9E9;text-align:right;" |Elected
! style="background-color:#E9E9E9;text-align:right;" | ±
|-
|style="background-color:Pink;border-bottom-style:hidden;" rowspan="15" |
| width=1px style="background-color: " |
| style="text-align:left;" |Democratic Alliance for the Betterment of Hong Kong
|81,126 || 11.82 || 83 || 37 || 12
|-
| width=1px style="background-color: " |
| style="text-align:left;" |Liberal Party
|50,755 || 7.39 || 89 || 18 || 6
|-
|style="background-color:"|
| style="text-align:left;" |Liberal Democratic Federation of Hong Kong
| 25,499 || 3.72 || 28 || 11 || 5
|-
| width=1px style="background-color: " |
| style="text-align:left;" |Civil Force
|12,141 || 1.77 || 10 || 10 || 7
|-
|style="background-color:#007034"|
| style="text-align:left;" |East Kowloon District Residents' Committee
|9,197 || 1.34 || 11 || 8 || 0
|-
|style="background-color:#9E5238"|
| style="text-align:left;" |Kwun Tong Man Chung Friendship Promotion Association
|11,952 || 1.74 || 12 || 7 || 2
|-
|style="background-color:"|
| style="text-align:left;" |United Front for the Service of the People
|9,720 || 1.42 || 8 || 4 || 
|-
|style="background-color:"|
| style="text-align:left;" |Public Affairs Society
|6,982 || 1.02 || 15 || 2 || 1
|-
|style="background-color:#E21C2A"|
| style="text-align:left;" |Kowloon City District Residence Association
|1,486 || 0.22 || 2 || 2 || -
|-
|style="background-color:#00652E"|
| style="text-align:left;" |Sham Shui Po Residents Association
|332 || 0.05 || 3 || 2 || -
|-
|style="background-color:#810002"|
| style="text-align:left;" |Mongkok District Residence Association
|1,450 || 0.21 || 2 || 1 || -
|-
|style="background-color:#44B5AF"|
| style="text-align:left;" |Tai Po District Residence Association
|3,325 || 0.48 || 4 || 1 || -
|-
| width=1px style="background-color: " |
| style="text-align:left;" |Hong Kong Progressive Alliance
| 3,288 || 0.48 || 7 || 1 || 0
|-
|style="background-color:Black"|
| style="text-align:left;" |New Territories West Residents Association
|2,187 || 0.32 || 5 || 1 || 1
|-
|style="background-color:"|
| style="text-align:left;" | Pro-China independents and others
| 151,436 || 22.08 || 162 || 90 || 
|-
|- style="background-color:Pink"
| colspan=3 style="text-align:left;" | Total for pro-China and conservative parties and allies || 371,455 || 54.12 || 442 || 196 || 23
|-
|style="background-color:LightGreen;border-bottom-style:hidden;" rowspan="11"|
| width=1px style="background-color: " |
| style="text-align:left;" |United Democrats–Meeting Point
| 157,929 || 23.01 || 133 || 75 || 26
|-
| width=1px style="background-color: " |
| style="text-align:left;" |Hong Kong Association for Democracy and People's Livelihood
| 47,731 || 6.95 || 40 || 29 || 12
|-
| width=1px style="background-color: " |
| style="text-align:left;" |123 Democratic Alliance
| 15,527 || 2.26 || 20 || 6 || 0
|-
|style="background-color:"|
| style="text-align:left;" |Hong Kong Democratic Foundation
|4,048 || 0.59 || 5 || 3 || 0
|-
|style="background-color:Green"|
| style="text-align:left;" |Kowloon City Observers
|5,164 || 0.75 || 6 || 2 || 1
|-
|style="background-color:"|
| style="text-align:left;" |Hong Kong Public Doctors' Association
|3,273 || 0.48 || 3 || 2 || -
|-
| width=1px style="background-color: " |
| style="text-align:left;" |Hong Kong Confederation of Trade Unions
|2,850 || 0.42 || 2 || 2 || -
|-
|style="background-color:"|
| style="text-align:left;" |Hong Kong Professional Teachers' Union
|2,127 || 0.31 || 1 || 1 || -
|-
| width=1px style="background-color: " |
| style="text-align:left;" |Neighbourhood and Worker's Service Centre
|859 || 0.13 || 3 || 1 || 1
|-
|style="background-color:Red"|
| style="text-align:left;" |Pioneer
|387 || 0.06 || 1 || 0 || -
|-
|style="background-color:"|
| style="text-align:left;" |Independent democrats and others
| 40,803 || 5.94 || 35 || 25 ||

|-style="background-color:LightGreen"
| colspan=3 style="text-align:left;" | Total for pro-democracy parties and allies || 280,698 || 40.89	|| 249 || 146 || 48
|-
|- style="background-color:#DDDDDD;"
| colspan=3 style="text-align:left;" | Total for others || 34,255 || 4.99 || 66	|| 4 || 2
|-
|style="text-align:left;background-color:#E9E9E9" colspan="3"|Total (turnout 33.1%)
|width="75" style="text-align:right;background-color:#E9E9E9"|686,408
|width="30" style="text-align:right;background-color:#E9E9E9"|100.0
|style="text-align:right;background-color:#E9E9E9"|757
|style="text-align:right;background-color:#E9E9E9"|346
|style="text-align:right;background-color:#E9E9E9"|73
|}

Results by district

Vote summary

Seat summary

References

 
Hong Kong local elections
Local elections
1994
Hong Kong local elections
Hong Kong local elections